Angelina Phera Polius is a Saint Lucian politician, senator in the Upper house and former veteran educator. Polius contested the 2021 Saint Lucia General Election as a United Workers Party Candidate for the Dennery North Constituency. She was unsuccessful against the incumbent Shawn Edward.

Education 
Polius holds a Bachelor's degree in Education with First Class Honours from the University of the West Indies. She also obtained a master's degree in New Literacies from the University of Sheffield.

Political career 
Polius became a senator on 15 September 2020 as she replaced her predecessor Timothy Mangal who resigned. She became a United Workers Party Senator once again after the 2021 Saint Lucia General Election since she was unable to claim a seat in the House of Assembly.

References 

Living people
Members of the Senate of Saint Lucia
21st-century Saint Lucian women politicians
21st-century Saint Lucian politicians
United Workers Party (Saint Lucia) politicians
Year of birth missing (living people)